Geodia amadaiba is a species of sponge from the family Geodiidae. The species is found in the waters of Japan and was first described by Tanita & Hoshino in 1989.

References

Tetractinellida
Animals described in 1989